North Carolina Highway 143 (NC 143) is a primary state highway in the U.S. state of North Carolina.  It runs from the Tennessee state line to NC 28, near the community of Stecoah.  It is best known for its  section of the Cherohala Skyway, shared with Tennessee State Route 165.

Route description

NC 143 begins at the Tennessee state line at Beech Gap, along the Unicoi Crest. For the next , known as the Cherohala Skyway, the highway stays along mostly the north-side of the Johns Knob, Little Haw Knob, Haw Knob, Hooper Bald, and Cedar Top, before descending at the Santeetlah Gap. At Snowbird Road, NC 143 Business begins going at a southerly route, through Milltown, into Robbinsville, as the mainline goes north.

The next  of highway is completely different, as NC 143 goes along the southern banks of Lake Santeetlah, which has a lot of twist and turns, though not much on elevation changes. North of Robbinsville, it joins a concurrency with US 129 as it goes south into town.  Within the town limits, the highway is called the Rodney Orr Bypass, named in honor of NASCAR driver Rodney Orr (approved on April 7, 1995).  Meeting back with NC 143 Business, at Main Street, followed by US 129 split  later continuing south towards Andrews; NC 143 continues east along Sweetwater Road out of town.

The last  of NC 143 feature steep elevation changes. From Orr Branch Road (elevation ), the road climbs ups the southwestern side of the Cheoah Mountains. The highway goes north along the eastern side of the Cheoah Mountains, reaching NC 28 at Johnson Gap (elevation ).

NC 143 is part of one scenic byway in the state (indicated by a Scenic Byways sign). Cherohala Skyway is an  byway and National Scenic Byway in western Graham County. It is known as a connector between the Cherokee National Forest and the Nantahala National Forest, thus the name Cherohala.  The entire route offers scenic views of unspoiled forested mountains in Western North Carolina.

History
In 1979, NC 143 was established as a new primary route between Robbinsville and Stecoah, on already existing roads.  Topography maps of Graham County in the early 1990s show an incomplete Cherohala Skyway already numbered as NC 143; however, this was not official until October 12, 1996, when NC 143 was extended to a completed Cherohala Skyway and its current western terminus at the Tennessee state line.

The Cherohala Skyway segment dates earlier than NC 143 (1962), but was not completed until 1996 with a total cost of $100 million over the whole 34 years of construction.

Future

NCDOT plans various safety improvements along NC 143, between West Buffalo Creek to NC 143 Business.  The estimated cost for the entire project is $15.4 million with property acquisition starting August 2013 and construction to begin December 2014.

Junction list

Business route

NC 143 Business (NC 143 Bus.) is a business route of NC 143 established in February 1997. The  route begins west of the town at NC 143 and travels east along Snowbird Road and through downtown Robbinsville via Junaluksa Road and Main Streets. It meets back with NC 143 and US 129 on Rodney Orr Bypass. Historically, NC 143 has never been routed through Robbinsville; though US 129 did before the bypass.

References

External links

 
 NCRoads.com: N.C. 143

143
Transportation in Graham County, North Carolina